Otavalo Canton is a canton of Ecuador, located in Imbabura Province. Its capital is the city of Otavalo. The Canton's population in the 2010 census was 104,874 compared to 90,188 in the 2001 census. Indigenous people, especially the Otavalo people, make up 57 percent of the total population.

Demographics
Ethnic groups as of the Ecuadorian census of 2010:
Indigenous  57.2%
Mestizo  40.3%
White  1.1%
Afro-Ecuadorian  1.0%
Montubio  0.2%
Other  0.1%

References

Cantons of Imbabura Province